The Gerald J. and Dorothy R. Friedman School of Nutrition Science and Policy (also called the Friedman School) at Tufts University brings together biomedical, nutritional, clinical, social, and behavioral scientists to conduct research, educational, and community service programs in the field of human nutrition. Founded in 1981, the school's mission is to generate trusted science, educate future leaders, and produce real world impact in nutrition science and policy. The Friedman School is one of the eight schools that currently comprise Tufts University. Although originally split between the university's Medford/Somerville campus and the health sciences campus in Boston, almost all of the school's facilities and programs now share the health sciences campus with the School of Medicine and the School of Dental Medicine. The Jaharis Family Center for Biomedical and Nutrition Research, which opened in 2002, houses most of the nutrition school. The school currently enrolls over 200 masters and doctoral students.

Organization and faculty
The Friedman School is under the supervision of a dean, appointed by the president and the provost, with the approval of the Trustees of Tufts College (the university's governing board). The dean has responsibility for the overall administration of the school, including faculty appointments, curriculum, admissions and financial aid, student affairs, development, and facilities.

Dariush Mozaffarian, a cardiologist and epidemiologist, was appointed dean of the Friedman School in 2014, assuming the post on July 1 of that year.

Faculty at the school include biomedical scientists, economists, nutritionists, epidemiologists, physicians, political scientists and psychologists focusing on a myriad of issues with the common thread of nutrition and its role in understanding and fostering the growth and development of human populations. The school's concern with the problems of hunger and malnutrition in United States and abroad is reflected in the research and applied work being done by its faculty and students. Areas of specialty include the socioeconomic parameters of malnutrition, nutrition program design and implementation, social marketing and development policy. Graduates of the programs in these areas are employed in government and non-governmental agencies as well as private voluntary organizations throughout the world and in the United States.

Many Friedman School faculty members hold a dual appointment at the Jean Mayer Human Nutrition Research Center on Aging. Supported by the USDA Agricultural Research Service, the HNRCA is the largest research institution in the world devoted to investigating the relationship between nutrition and aging.

External links
 

Friedman School of Nutrition Science and Policy
Nutritional science organizations
Educational institutions established in 1981
University subdivisions in Massachusetts
1981 establishments in Massachusetts